The 1979 Canadian federal budget was presented by Minister of Finance John Crosbie in the House of Commons of Canada on 11 December 1979. It was the first and only Canadian federal budget presented under the premiership of Joe Clark. The budget was never adopted, as the government was defeated in a vote of confidence on a budget subamendment on December 13, 1979.

Background
The budget is tabled six-and-a-half months after the 1979 Canadian federal election where the Progressive Conservatives led by Joe Clark won 136 seats, falling 6 seats short of a majority. On paper, support from either one of the three other official status parties (Liberal, NDP or Social Credit) would be enough to pass a budget should all the PC MPs vote likewise.

The economic climate was still precarious with a series of mixed signals during 1979:
 GDP growth and employment took a turn for the better, with strong recovery of business investment;
 Balance of payments and external trade balance seriously deteriorated due to slowing exports to the US (due to the weak economy there) and increasing imports (especially of foreign-made machinery and equipment);
 Inflation still remained high with CPI increase of 9% over 1978.

Taxes
Despite having campaigned on tax cuts during the 1979 Canadian federal election, Joe Clark's first budget contained several measures that departed from that. The budget included an 18-cent per gallon tax increase on gasoline, a 10 percent tax increase tobacco products, and a corporate surtax amounting to 1 percent of their income taxes. Farmers, Fishermen, and public urban transit were to receive a 10 percent gasoline tax rebate.

Personal income taxes
 Introduction of a refundable energy tax credit: to ease the impact of the proposed energy tax, the government planned for the introduction of an income-tested refundable tax credit of up to $80 per adult and $30 per child.
 Introduction of the Mortgage Interest and Property Tax Credit: scheduled to be phased in over 3 years (1980 to 1982). That measure is however not included in the Notice of Ways and Means Motion tabled along the budget.
 Creation of the Canadian Common Stock Investment Plan to encourage savings in common stocks of businesses in Canada
 Refundable Quebec abatement: the government planned to make the Quebec abatement refundable for the portion in excess of federal tax payable, starting in the 1980 fiscal year.

Corporate income taxes
 Temporary 5% surtax: a 5% surtax is imposed for all corporations for fiscal years ending between 12 December 1979 (date of the budget) and 31 December 1981.

Other taxes

Gasoline tax
The Gasoline tax (officially designated Energy Tax in the budget speech) was implemented at midnight between December 11 and December 12, the night the budget was announced. This led many Canadians to rush to the gas stations to buy "cheap gas" before the gas tax came into effect at midnight that night. However, when the government fell on December 13, the gas tax was rolled back, along with other budgetary measures that were provisionally implemented.

Expenditures

Legislative history
The day following the presentation of the budget, the Liberals and the New democrats vowed to do everything they could to bring down the government. The Social Credit Party also announced that they would not support the budget. Before the no-confidence vote, Joe Clark entered negotiations with Socred leader Fabien Roy to obtain their support for the budget. Clark offered to double the energy tax credit proposed in the bill, but to no avail. Roy believed Joe Clark had come to him too late to obtain their support for the budget, and thus left too little time for negotiations. The government was ultimately defeated 139 to 133 on a confidence vote of an NDP motion proposed by Bob Rae condemning the budget.

Aftermath
Following the fall of the government, Pierre Elliot Trudeau decided to walk back his resignation from the leadership of the Liberal Party. Trudeau ended up defeating Joe Clark and in the 1980 Canadian federal election as the Liberals were swept back in power with a majority government.

Notes and references

Official documents 
 
 
 

Canadian budgets
1979 in Canadian law
1979 government budgets
1979 in Canadian politics